Guangdong, alternatively romanized as Canton or Kwangtung, is a coastal province in South China on the north shore of the South China Sea. The capital of the province is Guangzhou. Its economy is larger than that of any other province in the nation and the fifth largest sub-national economy in the world with a GDP (nominal) of 1.95 trillion USD (12.4 trillion CNY) in 2021. The Pearl River Delta Economic Zone, a Chinese megalopolis, is a core for high technology, manufacturing and foreign trade. Located in this zone are two of the four top Chinese cities and the top two Chinese prefecture-level cities by GDP; Guangzhou, the capital of the province, and Shenzhen, the first special economic zone in the country. These two are among the most populous and important cities in China, and have now become two of the world's most populous megacities and leading financial centres in the Asia-Pacific region.

The province of Guangdong surpassed Henan and Shandong to become the most populous province in China in January 2005, registering 79.1 million permanent residents and 31 million migrants who lived in the province for at least six months of the year; the total population was 104,303,132 in the 2010 census, accounting for 7.79 percent of Mainland China's population. This makes it the most populous first-level administrative subdivision of any country outside of South Asia. Its population increase since the census has been modest, the province registering 108,500,000 people in 2015. The vast majority of the historical Guangdong Province is administered by the People's Republic of China (PRC). Pratas Island in the South China Sea is part of Cijin District, Kaohsiung, Taiwan (ROC); the island was previously part of Guangdong Province before the Chinese Civil War.

Guangdong has a diversified economy. It was known as the starting point of the Maritime Silk Road of ancient China. Since 1989, Guangdong has topped the total GDP rankings among all provincial-level divisions, with Jiangsu and Shandong second and third in rank. In 2020, Guangdong's GDP nominal was 11 trillion RMB (1.7 trillion USD), exceeding that of Canada (US$1.64 trillion) and South Korea (US$1.63 trillion), the world's 9th and 10th largest economy, respectively. Compared to a country, it would be the 9th-largest economy as of 2020 and the 11th most populous. The province contributes approximately 9% of the total economic output of mainland China and is home to the production facilities and offices of a wide-ranging set of Chinese and foreign corporations. Guangdong has benefited from its proximity to the financial hub of Hong Kong, which it borders to the south. Guangdong also hosts the largest import and export fair in China, the Canton Fair, hosted in the provincial capital of Guangzhou.

After the unification of Lingnan region in the Qin dynasty, the immigrants from the Central Plains moved in and formed the local culture with a unique style. With the outward movement of the Guangdong people, the Hakka and Cantonese languages, music, cuisine, opera and tea ceremony have been spread throughout the nation, Southeast Asia and other countries. Guangdong was also the birthplace of the father of modern China and the founder of the Republic of China, Sun Yat-sen where he later declared a military government in the Warlord Era. The two special administrative regions of Hong Kong and Macau fall within the scope of Guangdong cultural influence, and Guangdong culture still has profound influences on the Chinese in Singapore and Malaysia.

Guangdong is also one of the leading provinces in research and education in China. Guangdong hosts 160 institutions of higher education, ranking first in South Central China region and 2nd among all Chinese provinces/municipalities after Jiangsu. As of 2022, two major cities ranked in the top 30 cities in the world (Guangzhou 10th and Shenzhen 28th) by scientific research output, as tracked by the Nature Index.

Name 
"Guǎng" means "wide" or "vast", and has been associated with the region since the creation of Guang Prefecture in AD 226. The name "Guang" ultimately came from Guangxin, an outpost established in Han dynasty near modern Wuzhou, whose name is a reference to an order by Emperor Wu of Han to "widely bestow favors and sow trust". Together, Guangdong and Guangxi are called Loeng gwong During the Song dynasty, the Two Guangs were formally separated as Guǎngnán Dōnglù and Guǎngnán Xīlù, which became abbreviated as Guǎngdōng Lù and Guǎngxī Lù.

Historically, Canton was also used for the province itself, but often either specified as a province (e.g. Canton Province), or written as Kwangtung in the Wade–Giles system and now most commonly as Guangdong in Pinyin. The local people of the city of Guangzhou (Canton) and their language are called Cantonese in English. Because of the prestige of Canton and its accent, Cantonese can also be used, in a wider sense, for the phylogenetically related residents and Chinese dialects outside the provincial capital.

History

Prehistory
The Neolithic era began in the Pearl River Delta 7,000 years before present (BP), with the early period from around 7000 to 5000 BP (c. 5050–3050 BC), and the late period from about 5000 to 3500 BP (c. 3050–1550 BC). In coastal Guangdong, the Neolithic was likely introduced from the middle Yangtze River area (Jiao 2013). In inland Guangdong, the neolithic appeared in Guangdong 4,600 years before present (BP). The Neolithic in northern inland Guangdong is represented by the Shixia culture, which occurred from 4600 to 4200 BP (c. 2650–2250 BC).

Imperial
Originally inhabited by a mixture of tribal groups known to the Chinese as the Baiyue ("Hundred Yue"), the region first became part of China during the Qin dynasty. Under the Qin Dynasty, Chinese administration began and along with it reliable historical records in the region. After establishing the first unified Chinese empire, the Qin expanded southwards and set up Nanhai Commandery at Panyu, near what is now part of Guangzhou. The region was an independent kingdom as Nanyue between the fall of Qin and the reign of Emperor Wu of Han. The Han dynasty administered Guangdong, Guangxi, and northern Vietnam as Jiaozhi Province; southernmost Jiaozhi Province was used as a gateway for traders from the west—as far away as the Roman Empire. Under the Wu Kingdom of the Three Kingdoms period, Guangdong was made its own province, the Guang Province, in 226 CE.

Canton was a prosperous port city along a tropical frontier region beset by disease and wild animals, but rich in oranges, banyan, bananas, and lychee fruits. They traded slaves, silk and chinaware with Persians, Brahmans and Malays in exchange for their renowned medicines and fragrant tropical woods. Shi'a Muslims who had fled persecution in Khorasan and Buddhists from India lived side by side in the thriving town each erecting their own houses of worship. A foreign quarter sprang up along the river where many traders of diverse backgrounds including Arabs and Singhalese took up residence.

The port's importance declined after it was raided by Arabs and Persians in 758 and the foreign residents were at times troubled by the corrupt local officials, sometimes responding violently. During one incident in 684, for example, a merchant vessel's captain murdered a corrupt governor who had used his position to steal from the merchant.

Together with Guangxi, Guangdong was made part of Lingnan Circuit (political division Circuit), or Mountain-South Circuit, in 627 during the Tang dynasty. The Guangdong part of Lingnan Circuit was renamed Guangnan East Circuit in 971 during the Song dynasty (960–1279). "Guangnan East" is the source of the name "Guangdong".

As time passed, the demographics of what is now Guangdong gradually shifted to (Han) Chinese dominance as the populations intermingled due to commerce along the great canals. From the fall of the Han dynasty onwards, it shifted more abruptly through massive migration from the north during periods of political turmoil and nomadic incursions. For example, internal strife in northern China following the rebellion of An Lushan resulted in a 75% increase in the population of Guangzhou prefecture between the 740s–750s and 800s–810s. As more migrants arrived, the local population was gradually assimilated to Han Chinese culture or displaced.

As Mongols from the north engaged in their conquest of China in the 13th century, the Southern Song court fled southwards from its capital in Hangzhou. The defeat of the Southern Song court by Mongol naval forces in The Battle of Yamen 1279 in Guangdong marked the end of the Southern Song dynasty (960–1279).

During the Mongol Yuan dynasty, large parts of current Guangdong belonged to Jiangxi. Its present name, "Guangdong Province" was given in early Ming dynasty.

Since the 16th century, Guangdong has had extensive trade links with the rest of the world. European merchants coming northwards via the Straits of Malacca and the South China Sea, particularly the Portuguese and British, traded extensively through Guangzhou. Macau, on the southern coast of Guangdong, was the first European settlement in 1557.

In the 19th century, the opium traded through Guangzhou triggered the First Opium War, opening an era of Western imperialists' incursion and intervention in China. In addition to Macau, which was then a Portuguese colony, Hong Kong was ceded to the British, and Kouang-Tchéou-Wan (modern day area of Zhanjiang) to the French.

Due to the large number of people that emigrated out of the Guangdong province, and in particular the ease of immigration from Hong Kong to other parts of the British Empire (later British Commonwealth), many overseas Chinese communities have their origins in Guangdong and/or Cantonese culture. In particular, the Cantonese, Hakka, Teochew dialects have proportionately more speakers among overseas Chinese people than Mandarin-speaking Chinese. Additionally, many Taishanese-speaking Chinese emigrated to Western countries, with the results that many Western versions of Chinese words were derived from the Cantonese dialects rather than through the mainstream Mandarin language, such as "dim sum". Some Mandarin Chinese words originally of foreign origin also came from the original foreign language by way of Cantonese. In the United States, there is a large number of Chinese who are descendants of immigrants from the county-level city of Taishan (Toisan in Cantonese), who speak a distinctive dialect related to Cantonese called Taishanese (or Toishanese).

During the 1850s, the Taiping Heavenly Kingdom, whose leader Hong Xiuquan was born in Guangdong and received a pamphlet from a Protestant Christian missionary in Guangdong, was allied with a local Guangdong Red Turban Rebellion (1854–1856). Because of direct contact with the West, Guangdong was the centre of anti-Manchu and anti-imperialist activity. The generally acknowledged founder of modern China, Sun Yat-sen, was also from Guangdong.

20th century
During the early 1920s of the Republic of China, Guangdong was the staging area for the Kuomintang (KMT) to prepare for the Northern Expedition, an effort to bring the various warlords of China back under a unified central government. Whampoa Military Academy was built near Guangzhou to train military commanders.

At the end of the Chinese Civil War Guangdong became one of the Nationalist government's final footholds in Mainland China, with Guangzhou temporarily serving as the Kuomintang's provisional capitol. The People's Liberation Army seized control of the province after the retreat of the government of the Republic of China to Taiwan.

The new Chinese Communist Party administration issued harsh taxes, requisitioning between 22 and 60 percent of grain annually. However, the local party boss Fang Fang tried to moderate Chinese land reform policy in order to protect successful businesses in the Pearl River Delta, landholdings by overseas Chinese seeking to eventually return to the country, and commercial relations with British Hong Kong. In response Mao Zedong purged Fang and thousands of cadres from the province in 1952, sending Tao Zhu to implement a much harsher program under the slogan "Every Village Bleeds, Every Household Fights."

After the Chinese economic reform, the province has seen extremely rapid economic growth, aided in part by its close trading links with Hong Kong, which borders it. It is now the province with the highest gross domestic product in China.

In 1952, a small section of Guangdong's coastline (Qinzhou, Lianzhou (now Hepu County), Fangchenggang and Beihai) was given to Guangxi, giving it access to the sea. This was reversed in 1955, and then restored in 1965. Hainan Island was originally part of Guangdong, but it was separated into its own province in 1988.

Geography 

The Leizhou Peninsula is on the southwestern end of the province. There are a few inactive volcanoes on Leizhou Peninsula. The Pearl River Delta is the convergent point of three upstream rivers: the East River, North River, and West River. The river delta is filled with hundreds of small islands. The province is geographically separated from the north by a few mountain ranges collectively called the Nan Mountains (Nan Ling).

Guangdong borders Fujian to the northeast, Jiangxi and Hunan to the north, Guangxi autonomous region to the west, and Hong Kong and Macau Special Administrative Regions to the south. Hainan is offshore across from the Leizhou Peninsula. Pratas Island, which were traditionally governed as part of Guangdong, are part of Cijin District, Kaoshiung, Taiwan (ROC).

Cities around the Pearl River Delta include Dongguan, Foshan, Guangzhou, Huizhou, Jiangmen, Shenzhen, Shunde, Taishan, Zhongshan, and Zhuhai. Other cities in the province include Chaozhou, Chenghai, Nanhai, Shantou, Shaoguan, Zhanjiang, Zhaoqing, Yangjiang, and Yunfu.

Guangdong has a humid subtropical climate (Köppen Cfa inland, Cwa along the coast). Winters are short, mild, and relatively dry, while summers are long, hot, and very wet. Frost is rare on the coast but may happen a few days each winter.

Economy 

In 2021, the gross regional product (GRP) of Guangdong was about 12.4 trillion CNY ($1.95 trillion), with a per capita GDP of 98,700 RMB ($15,570 in nominal and $23,598 in PPP). It is the richest province in South Central China region and the fourth richest among all provinces after Jiangsu, Fujian and Zhejiang by GDP per capita. Guangdong has been the largest province by GDP since 1989 in Mainland China. In 2020, Guangdong's GDP nominal was 11 trillion RMB (1.7 trillion USD), exceeding that of Canada (US$1.64 trillion) and South Korea (US$1.63 trillion), the world's 9th and 10th largest economy, respectively. Guangdong's GDP by nominal is greater than the GDPs of all other BRICS states, except India.

Compared to country subdivisions in dollar terms, Guangdong's GDP in nominal is larger than all but four country subdivisions: California, Texas, New York State, and England. Compared to country subdivisions in PPP terms, Guangdong's GDP is larger than all, except California.

By Purchasing power parity (PPP) term, as of 2021, Guangdong's economy has a gross regional product (GRP) of $2.98 trillion, ranking between the United Kingdom and Italy with a GDP of $3.34 trillion and US$2.71 trillion respectively, the 10th and 11th largest in the world respectively.

After the communist revolution and until the start of the Deng Xiaoping reforms in 1978, Guangdong was an economic backwater, although a large underground, service-based economy has always existed. Economic development policies encouraged industrial development in the interior provinces which were weakly joined to Guangdong via transportation links. The government policy of economic autarky made Guangdong's access to the ocean irrelevant.

Deng Xiaoping's open door policy radically changed the economy of the province as it was able to take advantage of its access to the ocean, proximity to Hong Kong, and historical links to overseas Chinese. In addition, until the 1990s when the Chinese taxation system was reformed, the province benefited from the relatively low rate of taxation placed on it by the central government due to its post-Liberation status of being economically backward.

Guangdong's economic boom began with the early 1990s and has since spread to neighboring provinces, and also pulled their populations inward. The economic growth of Guangdong province owes much to the low-value-added manufacturing which characterized (and in many ways still defines) the province's economy following Deng Xiaoping's reforms. Guangdong is not only China's largest exporter of goods, it is the country's largest importer as well.

The province is now one of the richest in the nation, with the most billionaires in mainland China, the highest GDP among all the provinces, although wage growth has only recently begun to rise due to a large influx of migrant workers from neighboring provinces. By 2015, the local government of Guangdong hopes that the service industry will account for more than 50 percent of the provinces GDP and high-tech manufacturing another 20 percent.

In 2021, Guangdong's primary, secondary, and tertiary industries were worth RMB 500 billion (US$77.5 billion), RMB 5 trillion (US$0.78 trillion), and RMB 6.91 trillion (US$1.07 trillion), respectively. Guangdong contributes approximately 9% of the total national economic output. Now, it has three of the six Special Economic Zones: Shenzhen, Shantou and Zhuhai. The affluence of Guangdong, however, remains very concentrated near the Pearl River Delta.

Economic and technological development zones
 Shenzhen Export Processing Zone
 Shenzhen Futian Free Trade Zone
 Shenzhen Hi-Tech Industrial Park
 Yantian Port Free Trade Zone
 Foshan National New & Hi-Tech Industrial Development Zone
 Guangzhou Development District
 Guangzhou Export Processing Zone
 Guangzhou Free Trade Zone
 Guangzhou Nansha Economic and Technical Development Zone
 Guangzhou Nanhu Lake Tourist Holiday Resort (Chinese Version)
 Guangzhou New & Hi-Tech Industrial Development Zone
 Huizhou Dayawan Economic and Technological Development Zone
 Huizhou Export Processing Zone
 Huizhou Zhongkai Hi-Tech Development Zone
 Nansha Free Trade Zone
 Shantou Free Trade Zone
 Shatoujiao Free Trade Zone
 Zhanjiang Economic and Technological Development Zone (Chinese Version)
 Zhuhai National Hi-Tech Industrial Development Zone
 Zhuhai Free Trade Zone
 Zhongshan Torch High-tech Industrial Development Zone

Demographics 

Guangdong officially became the most populous province in 2005. Official statistics had traditionally placed Guangdong as the fourth-most populous province of China with about 80 million people, though an influx of migrants, temporary workers, and newly settled individuals numbered around 30 million. The massive influx of migrants from other provinces, dubbed the "floating population", is due to Guangdong's booming economy and high demand for labor. If Guangdong were an independent nation, it would rank among the twenty largest countries of the world by population.

Urbanization

Guangdong's population is 70.7% urban and 29.3% rural.

Recent trends
Guangdong's 2021 year end population has reached 126.84 million, adding 600 thousand people, or less than 1/2 a percent. It marks a huge change from rampant population growth of yesteryears, it had been among the fastest growing province due to migration, however in 2021, Zhejiang grew more, adding 720 thousand people.

Genealogy
Guangdong is the ancestral home of large numbers of overseas Chinese. Most of the railroad laborers in Canada, the Western United States and Panama in the 19th century came from Guangdong, especially the Siyi area. Many people from the region also traveled to California and other parts of the United States during the gold rush of 1849, and also to Australia during its gold rush a decade or so later.

Languages and ethnicities
The majority of the province's population is Han Chinese. Within the Han Chinese, the largest subgroup in Guangdong are the Cantonese people. Two other major groups are the Teochew people in Chaoshan and the Hakka people in Huizhou, Meizhou, Heyuan, Shaoguan and Zhanjiang. Shaozhou Tuhua is spoken in Shaoguan and Leizhou Min is spoken in the Leizhou Peninsula. There is a small Yao population in the north. Other smaller minority groups include She, Miao and Li.

Gender ratio
Guangdong has a highly unbalanced gender ratio that is among the highest of all provinces in China. According to a 2009 study published in The British Medical Journal, in the 1–4 age group, there are over 130 boys for every 100 girls.

Religion

According to a 2012 survey only around 7% of the population of Guangdong belongs to organised religions, the largest groups being Buddhists with 6.2%, followed by Protestants with 1.8% and Catholics with 1.2%. Around 90% of the population is either irreligious or may be involved in Chinese folk religion worshipping nature gods, ancestral deities, popular sects, Taoist traditions, Buddhist religious traditions & Confucian religious traditions.

According to a survey conducted in 2007, 43.71% of the population believes and is involved in ancestor veneration, the traditional Chinese religion of the lineages organised into lineage churches and ancestral shrines.

Politics 

Guangdong is governed by a dual-party system like the rest of China. The Governor is in charge of provincial affairs; however, the Communist Party Secretary, often from outside of Guangdong, keeps the Governor in check.

Relations with Hong Kong and Macau 
Hong Kong and Macau, while historically parts of Guangdong before becoming colonies of the United Kingdom and Portugal, respectively, are special administrative regions (SARs). Furthermore, the Basic Laws of both SARs explicitly forbid provincial governments from intervening in local politics. As a result, many issues with Hong Kong and Macau, such as border policy and water rights, have been settled by negotiations between the SARs' governments and the Guangdong provincial government.

Media 
Guangdong and the greater Guangzhou area are served by several Radio Guangdong stations, Guangdong Television, Southern Television Guangdong, Shenzhen Television, and Guangzhou Television. There is an English programme produced by Radio Guangdong which broadcasts information about this region to the entire world through the WRN Broadcast.

Culture 

The central region, which is also the political and economic center, is populated predominantly by Yue Chinese speakers, though the influx in the last three decades of millions of Mandarin-speaking immigrants has slightly diminished Cantonese linguistic dominance. This region is associated with Cantonese cuisine. Cantonese opera is a form of Chinese opera popular in Cantonese speaking areas. Related Yue dialects are spoken in most of the western half of the province.

The area comprising the cities of Chaozhou, Shantou and Jieyang in coastal east Guangdong, known as Chaoshan, forms its own cultural sphere. The Teochew people here, along with Hailufeng Min people in Shanwei, speak Hokkien, which is a Min dialect closely related to mainstream Southern Min (Hokkien) and their cuisine is Teochew cuisine. Teochew opera is also well-known and has a unique form.

The Hakka people live in large areas of Guangdong, including Huizhou, Meizhou, Shenzhen, Heyuan, Shaoguan and other areas. Much of the Eastern part of Guangdong is populated by the Hakka people except for the Chaozhou and Hailufeng area. Hakka culture include Hakka cuisine, Han opera, Hakka Hanyue and sixian (traditional instrumental music) and Hakka folk songs.

The outcast Tanka people traditionally live on boats throughout the coasts and rivers of Guangdong and much of Southern China.

Zhanjiang in southern Guangdong is dominated by the Leizhou dialect, a variety of Minnan; Cantonese and Hakka are also spoken there.

Mandarin is the language used in education and government and in areas where there are migrants from other provinces, above all in Shenzhen. Cantonese maintains a strong and dominant position in common usage and media, even in eastern areas of the province where the local languages and dialects are non-Yue ones.

Guangdong Province is notable for being the birthplace of many famous Xiangqi (Chinese chess) grandmasters such as Lü Qin, Yang Guanli, Cai Furu and Xu Yinchuan.

Education 
As of 2022, Guangdong hosts 160 institutions of higher education, ranking first in South Central China region and 2nd among all Chinese provinces/municipalities after Jiangsu (168). Guangdong is also the seat of 14 adult higher education institutions. Many universities and colleges are located in major cities like Shenzhen and Guangzhou. Guangzhou, the capital of Guangdong, hosts 83 institutions of higher education (excluding adult colleges), ranking 1st in South China region and 2nd (tie) nationwide after Beijing. Guangdong Province Department of Education is the department of the provincial government that oversees education. As of 2022, two major cities in the province ranked in the top 30 cities in the world (Guangzhou 10th and Shenzhen 28th) by scientific research output, as tracked by the Nature Index.

Colleges and universities

National 

 Sun Yat-sen University
 South China University of Technology
 Jinan University
 South China Agricultural University
 Guangdong University of Foreign Studies
 Guangzhou University of Chinese Medicine

Provincial 

 Dongguan Institute of Technology
 Dongguan University of Technology
 Foshan University
 Guangdong Education and Research Network
 Guangdong General Hospital
 Guangdong Institute of Education
 Guangdong Institute of Science and Technology
 Guangdong Medical College
 Guangdong Ocean University
 Guangdong Petrochemical Academy
 Guangdong Pharmaceutical University
 Guangdong Polytechnic Normal University
 Guangdong Radio and TV University
 Guangdong University of Finance & Economics
 Guangdong University of Finance
 Guangdong University of Technology
 Guangzhou Academy of Fine Arts
 Guangzhou Education College
 Guangzhou Medical College
 Guangzhou Normal University
 Guangzhou Sports University
 Guangzhou University
 Hanshan Teachers College
 Huizhou University
 Panyu Polytechnic
 Shaoguan University
 Shenzhen Party School
 Shantou University
 Shenzhen University
 Shenzhen Technology University
 Shenzhen Polytechnic
 Shunde University
 South China Normal University
 South University of Science and Technology of China
 Southern Medical University
 Wuyi University
 Xijiang University
 Xinghai Conservatory of Music
 Zhanjiang Normal University
 Zhongkai University of Agriculture and Engineering
 Zhaoqing University

Sports 

List of current professional sports based in Guangdong:

Tourism 
Notable attractions include Danxia Mountain in Shaoguan, Yuexiu Hill, Baiyun Mountain in Guangzhou, Star Lake and the Seven Star Crags, Dinghu Mountain in Zhaoqing, the Huangmanzhai waterfalls in Jieyang, and the Zhongshan Sun Wen Memorial Park for Sun Yat-sen in Zhongshan.

Administrative divisions 

Guangdong is divided into twenty-one prefecture-level divisions: all prefecture-level cities (including two sub-provincial cities):

The twenty-one Prefecture of Guangdong are subdivided into 119 county-level divisions (64 districts, 20 county-level cities, 34 counties, and 3 autonomous counties). For county-level divisions, see the list of administrative divisions of Guangdong.

Urban areas

International relations
Guangdong is twinned with:
  Aichi Prefecture, Japan
  Hawai'i, United States of America
  New South Wales, Australia
Gujarat, India

See also 
 Governors of Guangdong
 Major national historical and cultural sites in Guangdong

References

Citations

Sources 

 Economic profile for Guangdong at the Hong Kong Trade Development Council

External links

 
 Guangdong provincial government official website 
 Complete Map of the Seven Coastal Provinces from 1821 to 1850 
 Pictures and comments about life in Guangdong

 
.
Gulf of Tonkin
Pearl River Delta
Provinces of the People's Republic of China